The Embassy of the United Kingdom in Jakarta is the chief diplomatic mission of the United Kingdom in Indonesia. The current British Ambassador to Indonesia is Owen Jenkins. The British Ambassador to Indonesia also serves as the non-resident Ambassador to Timor-Leste and also as British representative to ASEAN.

History

The original embassy was built in 1962, to the designs of Eric Bedford, Chief Architect at the Ministry of Public Buildings and Works. It was ransacked on 16 September 1963 when anti-British sentiment led to attacks on both the British and Malaysian Embassies.  During the attack, the assistant military attache Roderick Walker played bagpipes as a sign of defiance against the mob attack.

The old Embassy building on Jl. MH Thamrin in Central Jakarta, had increasingly become the target of protesters. In 2004, the Islam Defenders Front (FPI) knocked down the building’s gate and pelted it with rotten eggs. The British government installed roadblocks at its two main access points, a move that was met with contempt from local residents. As a result of security issues the UK decided to seek a more suitable building.

The Embassy moved to its current location on Jl. Patra Kuningan Raya, South Jakarta in 2013 and was officially opened by Prince Andrew, Duke of York. It sits in grounds behind a secure gatehouse.

Other locations

Outside Jakarta, there is also a British Consulate in Bali where the senior officer is known as the Consul. The Embassy and Consulate also represent the British Overseas Territories.

See also
Indonesia–United Kingdom relations
List of diplomatic missions in Indonesia
List of Ambassadors of the United Kingdom to Indonesia

References

Jakarta
United Kingdom
Buildings and structures in Jakarta
Indonesia–United Kingdom relations